Jaclyn Roxanne Hill (née Eilers; born July 20, 1990) is an American entrepreneur and internet personality who gained popularity via her YouTube channel.

Early life
Jaclyn Eilers grew up near Mineral, Illinois on a farm that had been in her family for four generations.

In 1998, Jaclyn's family—including her father James, mother Robin, older brother Nicholas, and older sister Rachel—moved to Tampa, Florida, after her father said he was called by God to pursue missionary work and become an evangelist. For the next several years, the family traveled to countries including India and Honduras to preach Christianity. Hill has been estranged from her father since her parents' divorce in 2012.

Hill was homeschooled during her childhood. She attended college in Sarasota, Florida where she studied photography before dropping out after her freshman year. Hill formerly worked as a freelance makeup artist and at a MAC Cosmetics store.

Career

YouTube
In 2011, Hill started her YouTube channel, which became known for its celebrity makeup tutorials. In July 2017, she filmed a video with reality mogul Kim Kardashian West, titled "Get Ready with Me & Kim Kardashian", which has become one of Hill's most viewed videos.

Collaborations
In 2015, Hill collaborated with Australian cosmetics brand BECCA to release a highlighter called "Champagne Pop". Beauty retailer Sephora sold more than 25,000 units of "Champagne Pop" within 20 minutes of its release, breaking sales records. BECCA was bought by Estée Lauder for $200 million in 2017.

In 2015, Hill also collaborated with Morphe Cosmetics, creating a palette containing her favorite Morphe eye shadows. She released a limited-edition, gem-encrusted makeup brush set with Morphe in 2016, as well as a second eye shadow palette, under the marketing name "Jaclyn Hill x Morphe", in 2017. All three products sold out quickly after their release dates. In June 2018, Hill released her vault collection with Morphe. She said in her vault release video that these were the shades she didn't choose for her Morphe X Jaclyn Hill palette. The vault consists of 4 palettes with 10 pans. They too sold out quickly after release.

Hill's collaborations with BECCA and Morphe were reported to have sold $10.7 million and $12.2 million in EMVs, respectively.

Jaclyn Cosmetics
On May 23, 2019, Hill published a YouTube video announcing the launch of her namesake brand, Jaclyn Cosmetics, which included descriptions and swatches of the 20 nude "So Rich Lipstick" shades to be released within the week. This announcement was initially met with mostly positive reactions from long-time fans but yielded some criticism for her definition of a perfect nude shade, photos that showed some inconsistencies with pigment, and a lack of reviews from others in the beauty community. On May 30, 2019, 20 nude lipsticks were released through her website and, despite the mild controversy, the product sold out within the first day and seemingly proved to be successful. Upon the receipt of their orders, customers quickly noticed issues in quality and stated that their lipstick either arrived melted or that it broke after a single-use. While some defended the brand by saying hot temperatures and shipping conditions were to blame, many continued to voice more pressing concerns on social media. Photos were shared that depicted various flaws in the product, such as air bubbles, gritty texture, hair, and mold. Hill was quick to refute the claims by stating that she had not seen anyone complain, and suggested that the use of the lipstick in conjunction with other lip products was the cause of compromised quality. However, she encouraged customers to reach out to her and her team if they were dissatisfied in any way and promised to either compensate the customer or replace the product.

In more severe cases of dissatisfaction, reports began surfacing of allergic reactions to the product. Various symptoms that were reported included but were not limited to itching, swelling, redness, and cold sores. A petition was created calling for the lipsticks to be recalled, to which Hill did not respond. Hill addressed the growing concern on June 12, 2019 by publishing a video to her YouTube channel titled "My Lipsticks", in which she explains the potential causes of damage, extends her apologies to fans and customers, and reiterates to viewers that she intends to compensate those who share their dissatisfaction with her team.

Hill's apologies and her explanations were not well received by fans and the YouTube community and the backlash grew. Hill deleted her Instagram and Twitter accounts on July 3, leaving only her YouTube channel available to the public.

In 2021, Hill relaunched her cosmetic line with a Valentine's Day mystery collection which was available in four different sets each based with different price points. On March 2, Hill launched a Bronze and Blush duo and her Beaming Light loose highlighters. On April 24, 2022, Hill launched the Luxe Legacy Collection, a collaboration with her mother, Robin.  Hill says there will be many more upcoming drops for Jaclyn Hill Cosmetics on her Instagram story.

Personal life
Hill lives in Tampa, Florida. She married drummer Jon Hill (1989–2022) in August 2009. After almost 9 years of marriage, the couple announced their divorce on May 16, 2018. Hill stated, "We made good friends, not partners in life." Soon after her divorce, Hill began dating her current boyfriend, Jordan Torrey (who publicly goes by the name "Jordan Farnum"). This relationship sparked controversy, as Jon Hill and Farnum were known to have previously worked together and were close friends. In December 2021, Jordan and Jaclyn became engaged.

References

External links

1990 births
21st-century American businesspeople
21st-century American businesswomen
American cosmetics businesspeople
American YouTubers
Beauty and makeup YouTubers
Businesspeople from Tampa, Florida
Christians from Florida
Christians from Illinois
Living people
People from Bureau County, Illinois
YouTube vloggers